Arthur Joseph White (c. 1877 – July 25, 1929) was an American football player, coach, physician, and hospital administrator.  He served as the sixth head football coach at Boston College, coaching one season in 1902 and compiling a record of 0–8.  White graduated from Harvard Medical School in 1902.  He was assistant superintendent of Boston City Hospital from 1907 until his death in 1929.  He also headed the Boston Sanatorium at Mattapan from 1914 until his death.

Head coaching record

References

Year of birth uncertain
1870s births
1929 deaths
19th-century players of American football
Boston College Eagles football coaches
Boston College Eagles football players
Harvard Medical School alumni
Players of American football from Boston
Physicians from Massachusetts